The Volvo FMX (FMX meaning "Forward control Medium Xtreme") is a heavy duty truck produced by Volvo Truck Corporation. It was introduced in 2010. Based on the standard Volvo FM which is related, the FMX range is a multipurpose truck range for distribution, construction and on highway/off highway transport duties. As of 2011 the engine size is no longer added to the model denomination. The refreshed model based on the first generation FMX introduced in 2013 and then the second generation which is a completely makeover from 27 February 2020.



First Generation (2010–2020)

The original first generation FMX was introduced in 2010 and shared its platform and components with the FM. All FMX have been available with the choice of 11-litre and 13-litre Euro-5 engines, The D11 and D13 models. The production version went on sale in Europe in autumn 2010 and worldwide in 2011.

Facelift

The facelift version based on the FMX was unveiled in April 2013, with sales began in September 2013. It features a darken halogen HID headlights borrowed from the some base equipment of the FH16, a refreshed grille, and a redesigned dashboard with a choice of two digital dials and two analogue gauges, as well as a new steering wheel and an infotainment system. It also comes standard with the Volvo Dynamic Steering System. It is available with a choice of carry-over engines with Euro-VI.

Second Generation (2020–Present)
Unveiled on 27 February 2020, the second generation FMX which is a rugged only, compared to the standard FM. It is the first new models launched under the brand's recently President Roger Alm.

Some of the equipment features include a darken halogen LED headlights, a steel and polypropylene bumper, an energy-absorbing box construction a 3mm skid plate. It also retains a new generation steering wheel, a fully-digital instrument cluster, and a large touchscreen infotainment system.

The second generation FMX finally began sales later in 2020.

References

External links

FMX
Vehicles introduced in 2010